In the Institute of Electrical and Electronics Engineers, a small number of members are designated as fellows for having made significant accomplishments to the field. The IEEE Fellows are grouped by the institute according to their membership in the member societies of the institute. This list is of IEEE Fellows from the IEEE Power Electronics Society (IEEE-PELS).

See also 
List of IEEE Fellows

References 

Power Electronics Society